The European Network of Transmission System Operators for Gas (ENTSOG) is an association of Europe's transmission system operators (TSOs). ENTSOG was created on 1 December 2009 by 31 TSOs from 21 European countries. Creation of the ENTSOG was initiated by the adoption of the European Union third legislative package on the gas and electricity markets. It aims to promote the completion and cross-border trade for gas on the European internal market, and development of the European natural gas transmission network.  According to the third energy package ENTSOG is required to develop an EU-wide ten-year gas network development plan.

See also
Agency for the Cooperation of Energy Regulators
European Energy Community
European Network of Transmission System Operators for Electricity (ENTSO-E)
 Nord Pool

References

External links

 
Energy in the European Union
International energy organizations